The 1973 Women's College World Series was contested among 16 teams on May 17-20 in Omaha, Nebraska. It was the first series held under the auspices of the AIAW, which had recently been established by the Division of Girls' and Women's Sports (DGWS) for the purpose of conducting national championships.

Teams
The double-elimination tournament included these teams:

 Arizona State
 Ball State (Indiana)
 Iowa State
 Illinois State
 Kansas
 Michigan State
 Nebraska–Omaha
 North Dakota State
 Northern Colorado
 Northern Iowa
 South Carolina
 South Dakota State
 Southwest Missouri State
 Wayne State College (Nebraska)
 Weber State College (Utah)
 Western Illinois

Arizona State won its second consecutive WCWS championship, splitting the final two games with Illinois State, including the marathon final game that went 16 innings.  Margie Wright pitched all 16 innings in that game for the Redbirds as they narrowly fell to Arizona State, 4-3.  On the day of that final, Wright hurled 30 innings in three games. Ironically, for pitching too many innings in one day, a three-woman Illinois sports commission suspended her from pitching in any game in her upcoming senior season and also banned the softball team from post-season play in 1974.

Bracket

Source:

Ranking

See also

References

Women's College World Series
Soft
Women's College World Series
Women's College World Series
Women's College World Series
Women's sports in Nebraska